Thornlea Secondary School is a public high school, in the Regional Municipality of York, that opened in 1968 and is located in Thornhill, Ontario, Canada, on the northeast corner of Bayview Avenue and Willowbrook Road, just south of Highway 407.

The school began in 1968 as an educational experiment. The curriculum was varied and specialized, following a trimester system, and students were encouraged to address their teachers by their first names and focus on independent learning. Around 1980 this model gave way to a more traditional academic environment.

Academic life
Alongside traditional disciplinary staples such as English, mathematics, science (chemistry, physics, and biology), physical education, and social science (divided evenly between history and geography), Thornlea also offers courses in the fine arts, music (vocal, choral, orchestral, wind ensemble and jazz), drama, Introduction to business studies (General, marketing, and accounting),  and design and technology (automotive maintenance, communications, media & film studies, woodworking and engineering, cosmetology). A survey course in philosophy that is generally popular among Thornlea seniors has also been offered inconsistently over the years, depending upon the availability of a qualified instructor. A variety of creative writing courses have also been offered over the years, again, the existence of which has typically been a function of instructor interest and availability.

Students from Thornlea have been known to perform well in provincial competitions in the sciences, such as the Ontario Biology Competition, hosted by the University of Toronto, and various mathematics and engineering competitions hosted by the University of Waterloo. Business students have also done well, with Thornlea sending many to the DECA international finals over the years, as well as having many students achieve high scores on the ¢OIN CA Challenge accounting contest, run by the Institute of Chartered Accountants of Ontario. In addition, Thornlea has been recognized as claiming the top prize for several years in Wilfrid Laurier University's Stock Market Competition.

The school has special education courses & classes (some integrated, some self-contained) including: Autism (various courses run based on need), Alternative Education, and Acquired Brain Injury.

Criticisms
The physical structure of the building itself has been the target of many complaints, notably due to its poor internal ventilation, and its noticeable lack of exterior windows (there are windows inside the school). This architectural peculiarity is accounted for by the fact that Thornlea was originally intended to be a prototype for an educational model where extrinsic stimuli (such as vegetation, the sky, wildlife) are minimized, while intrinsic stimuli (such as bookshelves, other students in class, computer terminals) are maximized. The idea was that students would then be less distracted and more psychologically conditioned to focus on their studies during the day. However, some classrooms and staff rooms are located in the middle of the school surrounded by walls. This leads to overheating and poor ventilation in summer. At some point the experiment was abandoned, and a new southern wing was built during the 2000–01 school year, complete with windows for every classroom that has an externally facing wall.

In the 2012–2013 school year, the school gained local media attention when it was discovered that the principal planned on painting over the murals that adorned the empty spaces above the lockers.

Notable alumni

Music
Damon Richardson - Danko Jones, Change of Heart (band)
Dan Kowarsky - b4-4, RyanDan
Dave Matheson - Moxy Früvous
Dylan Sinclair - R and B Musician
Hayden - singer / songwriter
 Jason Levine - The Philosopher Kings, Prozzak
José Miguel Contreras, By Divine Right
Liz Teear - By Divine Right
Mike Ford - Moxy Früvous, The Cocksure Lads
Murray Foster - Moxy Früvous, Great Big Sea, The Cocksure Lads
Noah Mintz - hHead, Noah's Arkweld, producer & engineer
Raoul Juneja, former VJ, Omni Television
Ryan Kowarsky - b4-4, RyanDan
Sean Dean - Phleg Camp, The Sadies
Scott Davey -The Dishes (band)
Steve Berman - By Divine Right 
Steve Fall - Acid Test (band)
Tony Malone -The Dishes (band)

Film and television
Adam Korson - actor
Bill Welychka - former VJ, MuchMusic
Cameron Mathison - actor, All My Children
Daniel Magder - actor, Life With Derek
Ernie Grunwald - actor
Jian Ghomeshi - media personality, ex-host of CBC's Q
Kai Soremekun - director/actor, Heat
Lauren Collins - actress, Degrassi: The Next Generation
Sheila McCarthy - actor
Stu Stone - actor/musician, Donnie Darko, My Pet Monster, Blowin' Up

Sports
Rob Rusnov - Canadian archer who competed in the Pan American Games
Leonard Miller - Canadian basketball player

Politics
 Jim Watson (Canadian politician) - mayor of Ottawa, (2010 to 2022)

Other 
Joel Lee - famous youtuber 
Gordon Korman - youth novel writer
Mark Scheinberg - co-founder and former CEO of PokerStars
Moez Surani - poet
Parham Aarabi - professor (University of Toronto), entrepreneur

See also
List of high schools in Ontario

References

Further reading
Cases in Organizational Study
Thornlea: a case study

York Region District School Board
High schools in the Regional Municipality of York
1968 establishments in Ontario
Educational institutions established in 1968